Balti (Nastaʿlīq script: , Tibetan script: སྦལ་ཏི།) is a Tibetic language natively spoken by the ethnic Balti people in the Baltistan region of Gilgit−Baltistan, Pakistan, Nubra Valley of the Leh district and in the Kargil district of Ladakh, India. The language differs from Standard Tibetan; many sounds of Old Tibetan that were lost in Standard Tibetan are retained in the Balti language. It also has a simple pitch accent system only in multi-syllabic words while Standard Tibetan has a complex and distinct pitch system that includes tone contour.

Demographics and distribution
Balti is spoken in most parts of Gilgit-Baltistan in Pakistan, Kargil and Nubra Ladakh in India. According to the Gilgit-Baltistan Scouts, Balti is mostly spoken in Skardu, Shigar, Gultari, Ghanche, Roundu and Kharmang parts of Gilgit-Baltistan. In the twin districts of Ladakh region (Kargil and Leh) it is spoken in Kargil city and its surrounding villages like Hardass, Lato, Karkitchhoo and Balti Bazar and in Leh – Turtuk, Bogdang, Tyakshi including Leh city and nearby villages. Balti language is also spoken by Balti immigrants in Karachi, Lahore, Peshawar, Islamabad, Quetta and other cities of Pakistan. In India it is spoken in Dehradun, Nainital, Ambari, Shimla, Vikasnagar  and other cities of Northern India by immigrants who have migrated from Baltistan, Kargil, and Nubra before the partition of India and Pakistan.

Classification and dialects
Historically, Buddhists in Leh refer to all Muslims in Ladakh as Balti. Balti language has four variants or dialects. Despite differentiation in pronunciation of vocabularies they are mutually intelligible for example Yuq is pronounced as Juq in the Purgi dialect of Kharmang and Kargil. Similarly for Milk Oma is pronounced in eastern Chorbat Nubra and Khaplu and Kharmang Kargil's Purgi dialect while Ona is pronounced in the western dialect of Skardu, Shigar and Rondu valley. Four variants or dialects of Balti language are:

 Eastern dialect of Chorbat and Nubra valley
 Central dialect of Khaplu valley
 Western dialect of Skardu, Shigar and Rondu.
 Southern dialect of Upper Kharmang and Kargil also called Purgi dialect.

Phonology

Consonants

 can be realized as a flap .
 can be retroflex .

Vowels

  varies between an open back , an open-mid back  and an open central .
 The mid  can be as low as open-mid.

Orthographies
The predominant writing system currently in use for Balti is the Perso-Arabic script, although there have been attempts to revive the Tibetan script, which was used between the 8th and the 16th centuries. Additionally, there are two, nowadays possibly extinct, indigenous writing systems and there have been proposals for the adoption of Roman– as well as Devanagari-based orthographies that were adjusted for writing Balti by the Central Institute of Indian Languages in the 1970s.

In 1985, Yousuf Hussainabadi added four new letters to the Tibetan script and seven new letters to the Persian script to adapt both of them according to the need of the Balti language. Two of the four added letters now stand included in the Tibetan Unicode alphabet.

Balti was written with a version of the Tibetan script from 727 AD, when Baltistan was conquered by Tibetans, until the last quarter of the 14th century, when the Baltis converted to Islam. Since then, Persian script replaced the Tibetan script, but the former had no letters for seven Balti sounds and was in vogue in spite of the fact that it was defective. Adding the seven new letters has now made it a complete script for Balti.

Recently, a number of Balti scholars and social activists have attempted to promote the use of the Tibetan Balti or "Yige" alphabet with the aim of helping to preserve indigenous Balti and Ladakhi culture and ethnic identity. Following a request from this community, the September 2006 Tokyo meeting of ISO/IEC 10646 WG2 agreed to encode two characters which are invented by Abadi (U+0F6B TIBETAN LETTER KKA and TIBETAN U+0F6C LETTER RRA) in the ISO 10646 and Unicode standards in order to support rendering Urdu loanwords present in modern Balti using the Yige alphabet.

Perso-Arabic alphabet

Yige alphabet

Basic alphabets

Evolution
Since Pakistan gained control of the region in 1948, Urdu words have been introduced into local dialects and languages, including Balti. In modern times, Balti has no native names or vocabulary for dozens of newly invented and introduced things; instead, Urdu and English words are being used in Balti.

Balti has retained many honorific words that are characteristic of Tibetan dialects and many other languages.

Below are a few examples:

Literature
Other than proverb collections, no prose literature has been found written in Balti. Some epics and sagas appear in oral literature such as the Epic of King Gesar, and the stories of rgya lu cho lo bzang and rgya lu sras bu. All other literature is in verse. Balti literature has adopted numerous Persian styles of verse and vocables which amplify the beauty and melody of its poetry.

Nearly all the languages and dialects of the mountain region in the north of Pakistan such as Pashto, Khowar and Shina are Indo-Aryan or Iranic languages, but Balti is one of the Sino-Tibetan languages. As such, it has nothing in common with neighboring languages except some loanwords absorbed as a result of linguistic contact. Balti and Ladakhi are closely related.

The major issue facing Balti literature is its centuries-long isolation from Tibet and even from its immediate neighbor, Ladakh, due to political divisions and strong religious differences. Separated from its linguistic kin, Balti is under pressure from more dominant languages such as Urdu. This is compounded by the lack of a suitable means of transcription following the abandonment of its original Tibetan script. The Baltis do not have the awareness to revive their original script and there is no institution that could restore it and persuade the people to use it again. Even if the script were revived, it would need modification to express certain Urdu phonemes that occur in common loanwords within Balti.

Example of poetry:

See also
 Akhone Asgar Ali Basharat
 Sart
 Balti people
 Baltistan
 Gilgit-Baltistan

References

Bibliography

 Muhammad Yousuf Hussainabadi, 'Baltistan per aik Nazar'. 1984.
 Hussainabadi, Mohamad Yusuf.  Balti Zaban. 1990.
 Muhammad Hassan Hasrat, 'Tareekh-e-Adbiat;. 
 Muhammad Hassan Hasrat, Baltistan Tehzeebo Saqafat. 
 Muhammad Yousuf Hussainabadi, 'Tareekh-e-Baltistan'. 2003.
 Engineer Wazir Qalbi Ali, 'Qadam Qadam Baltistan'. 2006.
 "A Short Sketch of Balti English Grammar" by Ghulam Hassan Lobsang, 1995.
 Everson, Michael. ISO/IEC JTC1/SC2/WG2 N2985: Proposal to add four Tibetan characters for Balti to the BMP of the UCS. 2005-09-05
 Read, A.F.C. Balti grammar.London:The Royal Asiatic society, 1934.
 Sprigg, Richard Keith. Balti-English English-Balti dictionary. Richmond: RoutledgeCurzon, 2002.
 Backstrom, Peter C. Languages of Northern Areas (Sociolinguistic Survey of Northern Pakistan, 2), 1992. 417 pp. .

External links

 Balti Language Textbook for Class4
 Unicode
 Koshur: The Balti Language
The Balti School
 Tibetan script makes a comeback in Pakistan
 Proposal to add four Tibetan characters for Balti to the BMP of the UCS
 Andrew West, Tibetan Extensions 2 : Balti
 Pakistan's Northern Areas dilemma
 Northern Areas Development Gateway
 Pakistan's Northern Areas
 
 A Bibliography of Tibetan Linguistics
 
 

Bodic languages
Languages of Gilgit-Baltistan
Languages of Ladakh
Baltistan
Languages written in Tibetan script
Arabic alphabets for South Asian languages